Lambda function may refer to:

Mathematics
 Dirichlet lambda function, λ(s) = (1 – 2−s)ζ(s) where ζ is the Riemann zeta function
 Liouville function, λ(n) = (–1)Ω(n)
 Von Mangoldt function, Λ(n) = log p if n is a positive power of the prime p
 Modular lambda function, λ(τ), a highly symmetric holomorphic function on the complex upper half-plane
 Carmichael function, λ(n), in number theory and group theory

Computing
 Lambda calculus, in computer science
 Lambda function (computer programming), or lambda abstraction
 AWS Lambda, a form of serverless computing

See also
 Lambda point, of fluid helium